Wake FC is an American soccer club that currently competes in both the USL League Two for the men's team and the USL W-League for the women's team. Founded in 2012, Wake FC joined USL League Two for the 2019 season and the USL W-League in 2022.

Year-by-year

References

USL League Two teams
Sports in Wake County, North Carolina
Soccer clubs in North Carolina
2018 establishments in North Carolina
Association football clubs established in 2018